Tabernaemontana remota is a species of plant in the family Apocynaceae. It is found in Sulawesi in Indonesia, and also on Rossel Island (also called Yela), one of the islands in the Louisiade Archipelago, part of the Independent State of Papua New Guinea. The plant is listed as vulnerable.

References

remota
Vulnerable plants
Plants described in 1991
Flora of Sulawesi
Flora of Papua New Guinea
Taxonomy articles created by Polbot